A Tale of Christmas is a 1954 Australian television play. It was written by Kay Keavney.

It featured an early performance from Nick Tate and was shot at Pagewood Studios.

References

External links
 A Tale of Christmas at AustLit (subscription required)

Australian television plays
Christmas television films